Arab Shamilov (23 October 1897 – 1978) was a Yazidi Kurdish novelist who lived in the Soviet Union.

Early career 
During World War I, from 1914 to 1917, he served as an interpreter for the Russian army. Later on, he became a member of the central committee of the Armenian Communist Party. 
In 1931, he began working on Kurdish literature at the Leningrad Institute of Oriental Studies. He assisted in developing a Latin-based alphabet for the Kurdish language in 1927.

He became a member of the editorial board of the Kurdish newspaper Riya Teze (The New Path), published in Yerevan from 1930 to 1937. In Leningrad, he also met the Kurdish linguist Qenatê Kurdo and published his work as a document about Kurdish language in Armenia.

Literary output 
His first and most celebrated work, the story ̧Sivanê kurmanca û Kurdên Elegezê  (The Kurdish shepherd and the Kurds from Alagyaz), based on his own life, was published in 1935. It is considered the first Kurmanji novel. It treated his early life as a Sheperd and how he then turned communist and took part in the Russian Revolution of 1917. In 1937, he was exiled by Joseph Stalin and was only allowed to return to Armenia after 19 years, in 1956, following Stalin's death. 

In 1959, he published another novel,  (Жийина бәхтәwар) (meaning: Happy Life) that was then translated into Armenian and later also into Russian (1965). In 1966, he published a historical novel, Dimdim, inspired by the old Kurdish folk tale of  about the battle of Dimdim. It has been translated into Italian as well (as ). 
In 1967, he published a collection of Kurmanji folk stories in Moscow.

Books
 Şivanê Kurmanca, the first Kurdish novel
 Barbang (1958) (published in Yerevan by Haypetrat, 1959)
 Jiyana Bextewar (1959) (re-release: Roja Nû Publishers, 1990, 253 p.) 
 Dimdim (1966) (re-release: Roja Nû Publishers, 1983, 205 p.) 
 Hopo (1969) (re-release: Roja Nû Publishers, 1990, 208 p.)

See also 
 Yazidis in Armenia

References

 Avesta Cultural Magazine (in Kurdish)
 Kurdish Literature
 Malpera Mehname
 A Glimpse on the Kurdish Literature in the former Soviet Union
 Shamilov, Arab, "Dastanî Qelay Dimdim",  Kurdish Academy of Baghdad, 1975.

Kurdish-language writers
Kurdish writers
1897 births
1978 deaths
Soviet novelists
Soviet male writers
20th-century male writers
Recipients of the Order of Friendship of Peoples
Recipients of the Order of the Red Banner
Kurds in Armenia
Armenian Yazidis